The Fire Patrol is surviving American 1924 silent melodrama film directed by Hunt Stromberg and starring Anna Q. Nilsson that was based upon the 1891 play of the same name by James W. Harkins and Edwin Barbour. Stromberg also produced the film and released it through Chadwick Pictures.

Cast

Preservation
A copy of The Fire Patrol is preserved at La Corse Et Le Cinema, Porto Vecchio.

References

External links

1924 films
American silent feature films
American films based on plays
American black-and-white films
Surviving American silent films
1924 drama films
Silent American drama films
Melodrama films
Films directed by Hunt Stromberg
Films with screenplays by Garrett Fort
1920s American films